The Cape Smith Belt is an early Proterozoic thrust belt in northern Quebec, Canada.

References

Geology of Quebec